Platygillellus smithi is a species of sand stargazer native to the waters around the Bahamas where it occurs at depths of from .  It can reach a maximum length of  SL. Its specific name honours the collector of the type C. Lavett Smith (1927-2015) who was curator of fishes at the American Museum of Natural History.

References

smithi
Fish described in 1982
Taxa named by Charles Eric Dawson